Sherkat-e Banader (also Romanized as Sherkat-e Banāder; also known as Banāder) is a village in Shavur Rural District, Shavur District, Shush County, Khuzestan Province, Iran. At the 2006 census, its population was 1,276, in 201 families.

References 

Populated places in Shush County